Janar Soo (born 17 January 1991) is a former Estonian professional basketball player who played at the shooting guard position. He retired in January 2017 due to knee injuries.

Estonian national team
Soo has represented the Estonia men's national basketball team in 2015.

References and notes

External links
 Janar Soo at basket.ee 
 Janar Soo at bbl.net
 Janar Soo at fiba.com
 Janar Soo at eurobasket.com

1991 births
Living people
People from Kohila
Estonian men's basketball players
Shooting guards
Korvpalli Meistriliiga players
KK Pärnu players
Rapla KK players
BC Kalev/Cramo players
University of Tartu basketball team players